Raillardella pringlei is an uncommon species of flowering plant in the family Asteraceae known by the common name showy raillardella.

Description
Raillardella pringlei is a rhizomatous perennial herb growing in a clump of rosetted basal leaves. The leaves are linear to lance-shaped with smooth or faintly toothed edges, up to 15 centimeters long, and mostly hairless. Leaves also appear on the inflorescence in opposite pairs on a hairy-glandular stalk. The plant produces an inflorescence generally 25 centimeters to half a meter tall consisting of a solitary flower head or an array of up to three heads. The head is bell-shaped, sometimes widely so. It contains many orange to red-orange disc florets each about a centimeter long, and a fringe of several orange or reddish ray florets each up to 2 centimeters in length. The floral bract is densely covered with glandular hairs. The fruit is a long, narrow achene which may be 2 centimeters in length including its pappus of plumelike bristles.

Range and Habitat
Raillardella pringlei is endemic to the southern Klamath Ranges of northern California, where it grows in moist forest habitat on serpentine soils.

References

External links
Jepson Manual Treatment
USDA Plants Profile
Flora of North America
Photo gallery

Madieae
Endemic flora of California